The Major Arena Soccer League 2 is a North American indoor soccer league that serves as the developmental league of the Major Arena Soccer League.

History
M2 launched in 2017 to "provide an outlet for teams to either reorganize for a re-emergence in the MASL or an avenue for teams to compete in smaller markets in hopes of rising to MASL status." It was announced that M2 would have between 8 and 12 teams.

The 2018–19 season brought the total number of teams participating in the season up from 10 to 15. Stockton, California was announced as a market and held a team naming contest, but all news stories from the league website and all mention of the Stockton franchised were dropped. The league changed from having "Conferences" to "Divisions." Expanding from the Eastern and Western conference's the M2 now had the Eastern Division, Mountain Division, and Pacific Division.

On February 25, 2021, M2 announced the return of the RGV Barracudas FC to the league to compete in the 2021–2022 season.

On March 11, 2021, M2 officially welcomed the Cleveland Crunch to the league.

Sponsorship
The official game ball is made by Mitre, based in Wakefield, England.

Teams

Champions

Former/defunct teams

References

External links
Major Arena Soccer League 2
Major Arena Soccer League

Indoor soccer leagues in the United States
Sports leagues established in 2017
2017 establishments in the United States
Professional sports leagues in the United States
Professional sports leagues in Mexico
Multi-national professional sports leagues